Georgina Maria Gallego (born October 30, 1955) is an American actress, known for her work in television. Her credits include: Buck Rogers in the 25th Century, Flamingo Road (as Alicia Sanchez), Remington Steele, Airwolf, Rituals (as Diandra Santiago Gallagher), Knight Rider, Lust in the Dust, Santa Barbara (as Santana Andrade), Seinfeld, Beverly Hills, 90210, ER, NYPD Blue, JAG and The O.C.  She appeared in the 2009 horror film Murder World alongside Scout Taylor-Compton. In 2010, Gallego joined the cast of Days of Our Lives as recurring character, Warden Smith. She recurs on Crazy Ex-Girlfriend as the mostly mute Mrs. Hernandez.

Early life and education
Gallego was born in Los Angeles, California, daughter of Maria, a homemaker, and George Gallego, a landscape designer. She is of Mexican descent. Gallego grew up in the Brentwood and West LA areas of Los Angeles. While attending University High School, she became involved with the school's theater club. After graduating she studied under Gary Austin, the founder and original director of The Groundlings, a notable Los Angeles-based improv company. Another major influence on Gina's formative years was theatre director Jose Quintero. She has also studied with John Lehne, Susan Peretz at the Lee Strasberg Theatre Institute, and Candy Kaniecki.

Career
Gallego was discovered in Hollywood by the Alvarado Talent Agency, and within weeks was cast opposite of Jon Voight in director Franco Zeffirelli's’s The Champ. Her first role series television was on Flamingo Road (1981), playing Alicia Sanchez who marries Skipper Wheldon, a series’ lead, during the show's second season.

On Rituals (1984), the syndicated soap opera, Gallego played Diandra Santiago Gallagher, the wife of Tom Gallagher and the daughter of Latin-American politician, Enrique Santiago. She was featured on Santa Barbara (1984), where she played Santana Andrade, a Mexican maid who had a baby boy out of wedlock with wealthy playboy Channing Capwell Jr, and was forced into giving him up for adoption. Santana's storylines were dominated by her attempts to reclaim her child, and her long-running feud with her son's villainous adoptive mother Gina Capwell (Robin Mattson). Gallego replaced Margaret Michaels in the role of Santana in October 1985 and remained on the show until March 1987 - appearing in a total of 142 episodes. She briefly reprised the role for a five episode story-arc in November 1989.

On Seinfeld (NBC), Gallego guest-starred in the 1992 episode, The Suicide. In the episode Jerry's neighbor attempts suicide, but winds up in a coma. Jerry visits the comatose man in the hospital where Gallego, the neighbor's girlfriend, tries to seduce him.

In Erin Brockovich (2000), Gallego was cast as a Pacific Gas & Electric attorney who defends the utility company against allegations they caused carcinogens to poison drinking water in Hinkley, CA. She was cast as Consuela Lopez in Mr. Deeds (2002), a maid who's had an intimate encounter with media magnate, Preston Blake (Harve Presnell). Lopez had an illegitimate child with Blake, Emilio Lopez (John Turturro), who was later found to be the heir of Blake's fortune.

Gallego played a bar waitress in Anger Management (2003), who is accidentally knocked out by Adam Sandler's character, Dave Buznik. In Beverly Hills Chihuahua (2008), she played the Director of an Animal Shelter. Gallego also guest starred on a 7th-season episode of Grey's Anatomy as the openly homophobic mother of bisexual orthopedic surgeon Calliope 'Callie' Torres.

Gaellgo played Warden Jane Smith on Days of Our Lives (28 episodes). The Warden Smith storyline encompassed the imprisonment of Hope Brady who discovers an illegal operation inside the prison, and ultimately reports Smith to Brady's estranged husband, Bo, the police commissioner. Warden Smith flees to a hideout in upstate New York, but is eventually apprehended by the authorities.

Personal life
Gallego married actor Joel Bailey in 1983, and is the mother of one son, Brendan.

References

External links

1959 births
American film actresses
American television actresses
Living people
Actresses from Los Angeles
American actresses of Mexican descent
20th-century American actresses
21st-century American actresses
People from Brentwood, Los Angeles